Guillermo Bruno Victorino Giribaldi (born 17 May 1929) was a Curaçaoan footballer. He competed in the men's  tournament at the 1952 Summer Olympics.

References

External links
 
 

1929 births
Possibly living people
Curaçao footballers
Netherlands Antilles international footballers
Olympic footballers of the Netherlands Antilles
Footballers at the 1952 Summer Olympics
Place of birth missing (living people)
Association football midfielders
Pan American Games bronze medalists for the Netherlands Antilles
Footballers at the 1955 Pan American Games
Pan American Games medalists in football
Medalists at the 1955 Pan American Games